VMware Horizon (formerly called Horizon View) is a commercial desktop and app virtualization product developed by VMware, Inc for Microsoft Windows, Linux and macOS operating systems. It was first sold under the name VMware VDM, but with the release of version 3.0.0 in 2008 it was changed to "VMware View". The name was updated to "Horizon View" with the launch of version 6 in April 2014
and is now referred to as "VMware Horizon" to represent desktop and app virtualization.

Features
VMware Horizon  provides virtual desktop and app capabilities to users utilizing VMware's virtualization technology. A desktop operating system - typically Microsoft Windows - runs within a virtual machine on a hypervisor. VMware Horizon  product has a number of components which are required to provide the virtual desktops, including:

 VMware vSphere Hypervisor (ESXi with a vSphere license)
 VMware vCenter Server (management of virtualization environment)
 View Composer (advanced View management, with automation and cloning)
 View Manager (administration of the View Environment) 
 View Client (communication between View and the desktop OS)
 VMware ThinApp (application virtualization)
 View Persona Management (user profile management)
 vShield Endpoint (offloaded desktop antivirus)

Although VMware licenses vSphere hypervisor per physical CPU-socket, it licenses VMware View per concurrent desktop. The bundled hypervisor, vSphere for Desktops, is functionally equivalent to vSphere Enterprise Plus.

VMware View has two licensing options, Enterprise and Premier. Enterprise comes with vSphere for Desktops, vCenter Server, and View Manager, and has an MSRP of $150 per concurrent desktop. View Composer, Persona Management, vShield Endpoint, and ThinApp are included in the Premier edition at an MSRP of $250 per concurrent desktop.

In order to transport the desktop resources to users, keyboard, video, mouse and other interactions travel over a network connection. VMware View supports the VMware Blast Extreme, Microsoft RDP, and the Teradici PCoIP protocols.

VMware Horizon Client

Users establish client connections to VMware View sessions by running the VMware View Client, through a web browser using HTML5, or using a thin client that supports the protocols in use. The VMware View client supports Windows, macOS, Android, and Linux, while ChromeOS is able to connect through the web browser.

Ubuntu 12.10 can login to VMware View desktops directly from the login screen.

The Client software is known as Client Agent Release Train (CART). CART it is on a separate release cycle than VMware View/Horizon but often coincides with it.

Horizon Clients

CART 5.0 (Mar 18, 2019)
CART 5.1 (Jul 02, 2019)
CART 5.2 (Sep 17, 2019)
CART 5.3 (Dec 12, 2019)
CART 5.4 (March 17, 2020)
CART 5.5 (Oct 15, 2020)

Horizon Clients - Naming convention changed to denote the year and month of build release

CART 2006 (Aug 11, 2020)
CART 2009 (Oct 15, 2020)
CART 2012 (Jan 07, 2021)
CART 2103 (Mar 23, 2021)
CART 2106 (Jul 15, 2021)
CART 2111 (Nov 29, 2021)
CART 2203 (Apr 04, 2022)
CART 2206 (July 19, 2022)
CART 2209 (Oct 20, 2022)

Versions

VMware View/Horizon
Version release history:

VMware View 3.1.3 (May 5, 2009)

VMware View 4 (November 9, 2009)

VMware View 5.1 (May 16, 2012)
VMware View 5.1.1 (August 16, 2012)
VMware View 5.1.2 (December 13, 2012)
VMware View 5.1.3 (March 14, 2013)
VMware View 5.2 (October 4, 2012)
VMware View 5.3 (November 21, 2013)
VMware View 5.3.1 (March 11, 2014)
VMware View 5.3.2 (June 24, 2014)
VMware View 5.3.3 (November 25, 2014)
VMware View 5.3.4 (March 17, 2015)
VMware View 5.3.5 (September 10, 2015)
VMware View 5.3.6 (March 1, 2016)

VMware Horizon 6.0 (June 19, 2014)
VMware Horizon 6.0.1 (September 9, 2014)
VMware Horizon 6.0.2 (December 9, 2014)
VMware Horizon 6.1 (March 12, 2015)
VMware Horizon 6.1.1 (June 4, 2015)
VMware Horizon 6.2 (September 3, 2015)
VMware Horizon 6.2.1 (December 8, 2015)
VMware Horizon 6.2.2 (February 4, 2016)
VMware Horizon 6.2.3 (July 21, 2016)

VMware Horizon 7.0 (March 22, 2016)
VMware Horizon 7.0.1 (June 16, 2016)
VMware Horizon 7.0.2 (September 15, 2016)
VMware Horizon 7.0.3 (December 8, 2016)
VMware Horizon 7.1 (March 16, 2017)
VMware Horizon 7.2 (Jun 20, 2017)
VMware Horizon 7.3.2 (November 20, 2017)
VMware Horizon 7.4 (Jan 04, 2018)
VMware Horizon 7.5 (May 29, 2018) This is the first Extended Service Branch (ESB). ESBs will receive three planned periodic Service Updates (SPs) – 6 months, 9 months and 15 months after the base version release.
VMware Horizon 7.5.1 (July 19, 2018)
VMware Horizon 7.6 (Sep 6, 2018)
VMware Horizon 7.7 (Dec 13, 2018)
VMware Horizon 7.8 (March 14, 2019)
VMware Horizon 7.9 (Jul 02, 2019)
VMware Horizon 7.10 (Sep 17, 2019) This is an ESB release.
VMware Horizon 7.11 (Dec 12, 2019) VMware announces that Horizon Administrator (FLASH based) will be deprecated in early 2020. VMware recommends using Horizon Console (HTML5 based).
VMware Horizon 7.12 (March 17, 2020)
VMware Horizon 7.13 (Oct 15, 2020) This is the last significant release of Horizon 7. The end of general support for Horizon 7 is March 2021. 
VMware Horizon 7.13.1 (May 25, 2021)
VMware Horizon 8.0 (Announced Aug 6, 2020)
VMware Horizon 8.0 2006 (Aug 11, 2020) Naming convention changed to denote the year and month of build release in the format (YYMM).
VMware Horizon 8.1 2012 (Jan 7, 2021)
VMware Horizon 8.2 2103 (March 23, 2021)
VMware Horizon 8.3 2106 (July 15, 2021)
VMware Horizon 8.4 2111 (Nov 29, 2021)  This is an ESB release.
VMware Horizon 8.5 2203 (April 5, 2022) This release does not include updates for Horizon Connection Server.
VMware Horizon 8.6 2206 (July 19, 2022)
VMware Horizon 8.7 2209 (Oct 20, 2022)

References

Further reading
 Keith Schultz (December 14, 2011) VDI shoot-out: Citrix XenDesktop vs. VMware View. Citrix XenDesktop 5.5 and VMware View 5 vie for the most flexible, scalable, and complete virtual desktop infrastructure, InfoWorld
 Keith Schultz (December 14, 2011) VDI shoot-out: HDX vs. PCoIP. The differences between the Citrix and VMware remote desktop protocols are more than skin deep, InfoWorld

External links

Centralized computing
Remote desktop protocols
View